Narendra Darade is an Indian politician belonging to the Shiv Sena. On 24 May 2018, he was elected to the Maharashtra Legislative Council by receiving 412 votes, beating his rival Shivaji Shahane from Nationalist Congress Party, who received 219 votes.

Positions held
1991: Elected as corporator (Yeola municipal council)
2008: Won Yeola Merchant Bank election with the high majority under his leadership
2009: Elected as vice president of Nashik District central Co-operative Bank
2010: Started First Private, Santosh Agricultural Produce Market Committee
2011: Chairman, Yeola Agricultural Produce Market Committee(2011)
2012: Selected as chairman of MHADA (Nashik division) Nashik
2015: Elected as President of Nashik District Central Co-operative Bank
2018: Elected to Maharashtra Legislative Council

References

External links
 Shivsena Home Page

Living people
Year of birth missing (living people)